Michael McGarrity (born 1940) is a New Mexican author and former law enforcement officer.  He has written a dozen crime novels set in New Mexico and the American West trilogy, historical novels also set in New Mexico consisting of Hard Country, Backlands and The Last Ranch. As deputy sheriff of Santa Fe County he founded their sex crimes unit.

Early life
McGarrity attended the University of New Mexico for three years and graduated from San Jose State University with a Bachelor's degree with distinction in English and Psychology. He earned a Master's degree in clinical social work from the University of Iowa and is a graduate of the New Mexico Law Enforcement academy.

Career

Legal career and nonfiction writing
In addition to law enforcement work, he has been an investigator and caseworker for the New Mexico Public Defender's Office.  He worked on rehabilitating prison programs after the New Mexico State Penitentiary riot in 1980.  McGarrity has taught at several colleges and universities as well as the New Mexico Law Enforcement Academy.  As a social worker he published a number of articles in professional journals on a wide range of topics, ranging from therapy programs for children, to program assessment and evaluation, and drug treatment interventions.

Fiction writing
McGarrity's crime novels take place in modern New Mexico, with law enforcement officer Kevin Kerney as the protagonist. The settings are vividly evoked and range from the Tularosa Basin and Lincoln County to Hermit's Peak, although many take place in Santa Fe. "Hard Country," "Backlands," and "The Last Ranch" form a sweeping trilogy tracing the Kerney family's history in New Mexico from 1875 through the end of the Vietnam War. A ground breaking prequel trilogy, all three books are set on the Tularosa Basin of south central New Mexico.

Awards
McGarrity has been nominated three times for the Western Writers of America Spur Award for Best Western Novel as well as an Anthony Award for his debut novel, Tularosa.

He has received the following awards: 
 New Mexico Social Worker of the Year, 1980
 Santa Fe's Police Officer of the Year, 1987
 New Mexico Governor's Award for Excellence in the Arts — Literature, 2004
 Santa Fe Mayor's Award for Excellence in the Arts - Literature, 2015
 Frank Waters Exemplary Literary Achievement Award, 2015

Bibliography

Kevin Kerney series 

Tularosa (1996) — White Sands Missile Range, Tularosa Basin
Mexican Hat (1997) — Gila Wilderness in southwestern New Mexico
Serpent Gate (1998) — Mountainair and Santa Fe
Hermit's Peak (1999) — Hermit's Peak and Las Vegas, New Mexico
The Judas Judge (2000) — Central and southeastern New Mexico
Under the Color of Law (2001) — Santa Fe and western New Mexico
The Big Gamble (2002) — Lincoln and Santa Fe counties
Everyone Dies (2003) — Santa Fe
Slow Kill (2004) — California and New Mexico
Nothing But Trouble (2005) — Bootheel, the extreme southwestern New Mexico
Death Song (2007) — Lincoln County and Santa Fe
Dead or Alive (2008) — Northeastern New Mexico
Residue (2018) — Southwestern New Mexico

American West Trilogy books 

Hard Country (2012)
Backlands (2014)
The Last Ranch (2016)

References

Further reading
 Duval, Linda (29 July 1998) "Author Michael McGarrity says "perseverance, luck and talent" bring success to writers" The Gazette (Colorado Springs), Entertainment News Section

External links

 Michael McGarrity's homepage
Modern Signed Books BlogTalkRadio Interview with Rodger Nichols about The Last Ranch June 2016

American crime writers
Western (genre) writers
American thriller writers
1939 births
Living people
University of New Mexico alumni
University of Iowa alumni
American male novelists